Bungulu is a commune of the city of Beni in North Kivu, Democratic Republic of the Congo.

Beni
Communes of the Democratic Republic of the Congo